This is a list of defunct airlines of Gabon.

See also

 List of airlines of Gabon
 List of airports in Gabon

References

Gabon
Airlines
Airlines, defunct
Airlines